Monastero di San Salvatore (Monastery of San Salvatore) is located on the left bank of the Oglio river, in the municipality of Capo di Ponte in Val Camonica, Italy. Established at the end of the 11th century, it was the first and only Cluniac priory in Val Camonica. The monastery is an important example of early medieval Romanesque architecture.

Gallery

References

External links

Monasteries in Lombardy
Buildings and structures in the Province of Brescia
Christian monasteries established in the 11th century
11th-century establishments in Italy
Romanesque architecture in Lombardy
12th-century Roman Catholic church buildings in Italy
Roman Catholic churches in Lombardy